Nicholas Longworth II (June 16, 1844 – January 18, 1890) was a lawyer from a prominent Cincinnati, Ohio family who served on the Ohio Supreme Court.

Biography
Nicholas Longworth II was born June 16, 1844 in Cincinnati to Joseph and Anna Rives Longworth. Joseph Longworth was the only son of Nicholas Longworth, a lawyer, winemaker and land speculator, who came to Cincinnati in 1804, and for the year 1850 had a tax bill of $17,000, second only to John Jacob Astor in the United States. Anna Rives was the niece of William Cabell Rives.

Longworth was educated at the public schools in Cincinnati, and graduated from Harvard University in 1866 with high honors. He then studied law  under his uncle, (his mother's brother-in-law), Rufus King at the Cincinnati Law School, and was admitted to the bar in 1869. He had a partnership with his cousin, Edward L. Anderson, which dissolved in 1871. From 1871 to 1877 he practiced with King Thompson and Longworth.

In 1876, Longworth was elected to the Common Pleas Court of Hamilton County for a five-year term. On October 11, 1881 he was elected on the Republican ticket to the Ohio Supreme Court. On November 9, 1881, Washington W. Boynton resigned his seat three months before the end of his term due to ill health and meager salary, and Longworth was seated on that day. His term was scheduled to end February, 1887.

Longworth resigned from the court March 9, 1883, due to the failing health of his father, and the need to look after his estate. He formed a short-live legal partnership with Thomas McDougall, which dissolved upon his father's death late in 1883. He managed the business affairs of the estate, and travelled extensively. He also translated Electra from Greek, and had two stories published in 1889. He also had a steam yacht, the C.O., on the Ohio River, and raced yachts on Lake Erie.

Longworth died of pneumonia at Rookwood, his estate on Mount Adams, on January 18, 1890, and was buried at Spring Grove Cemetery. He was married on October 2, or 3, 1869 to Susan Walker. She was the daughter of the late Timothy Walker, one of the founders and Dean of the Cincinnati Law School. They had three children, Nicholas, born November 5, 1869, Annie Rives, born December 10, 1870, and Clara, born October 17, 1873.

Publications

See also
Longworth family
Nicholas Longworth - his son, Speaker of the US House
Nicholas Longworth (1783-1863) - his grandfather
Maria Longworth Nichols Storer - his sister
Timothy Walker (judge) - his father-in-law
Clara Longworth de Chambrun - his daughter

References

1844 births
1890 deaths
Burials at Spring Grove Cemetery
Harvard University alumni
Ohio Republicans
Justices of the Ohio Supreme Court
Ohio state court judges
Politicians from Cincinnati
University of Cincinnati College of Law alumni
19th-century American judges
Longworth family